Haliplus is a genus of crawling water beetles in the family Haliplidae. There are at least 180 described species in Haliplus. They are found worldwide, except for Antarctica, living among algae and aquatic vegetation at edges of ponds, lakes, and streams. They range in size from 1.75 to 5 mm.

Species
These species are members of the genus Haliplus.

 Haliplus abbreviatus Wehncke, 1880 g
 Haliplus africanus Aubé, 1838
 Haliplus alastairi Watts, 1988
 Haliplus aliae Vondel, 2003 g
 Haliplus allisonae Brigham i c g
 Haliplus alluaudi Régimbart, 1903
 Haliplus andalusicus Wehncke, 1872 g
 Haliplus angusi Vondel, 1991
 Haliplus angustifrons Regimbart, 1892 g
 Haliplus annulatus Roberts, 1913 i c g
 Haliplus apicalis (Thomson) g b  (saltmarsh crawler)
 Haliplus apostolicus Wallis, 1933 i c g
 Haliplus arrowi Guignot, 1936
 Haliplus aspilus Guignot, 1957
 Haliplus astrakhanus Vondel, 1991 g
 Haliplus australis Clark, 1862
 Haliplus bachmanni Vidal, Sarmiento & Grosso, 1970
 Haliplus basinotatus Zimmermann, 1924 g
 Haliplus bierigi Guignot, 1936 i c g
 Haliplus bistriatus Wehncke, 1883 g
 Haliplus blanchardi Roberts, 1913 i c g
 Haliplus bonariensis Steinheil, 1869
 Haliplus borealis LeConte, 1850 i c g
 Haliplus brandeni Wehncke, 1888 i c g
 Haliplus brasiliensis Zimmermann, 1924
 Haliplus camposi Guignot, 1948
 Haliplus canadensis Wallis, 1933 i c g b
 Haliplus carinatus Guignot, 1936 i c g
 Haliplus chinensis Falkenstroem, 1932 g
 Haliplus columbiensis Wallis, 1933 i c g
 Haliplus concolor Leconte, 1852 i c g b
 Haliplus confinis Stephens, 1828 g
 Haliplus confluentus Roberts, 1913 i c g
 Haliplus connexus Matheson, 1912 i c g b
 Haliplus crassus Chapin, 1930 i c g
 Haliplus cribrarius Leconte, 1950 i c g b
 Haliplus cubensis Chapin, 1930 i c g
 Haliplus curtulus Sharp, 1887 i c g
 Haliplus cylindricus Roberts, 1913 i c g
 Haliplus dalmatinus Muller, 1900 g
 Haliplus davidi Vondel, 1991 g
 Haliplus deceptus Matheson, 1912 i c g
 Haliplus diopus Guignot, 1955
 Haliplus diruptus J.Balfour-Browne, 1947 g
 Haliplus discessus Guignot, 1936
 Haliplus distinctus Wallis, 1933 i c g
 Haliplus dorsomaculatus Zimmermann, 1924 i c g b
 Haliplus ebolovensis Guignot, 1955
 Haliplus eremicus Wells, 1989
 Haliplus excoffieri Vondel, 1991 g
 Haliplus eximius Clark, 1863 g
 Haliplus exsecratus Guignot, 1936
 Haliplus falli Mank, 1940 i c g
 Haliplus fasciatus Aubé, 1838 i c g b
 Haliplus ferruginipes Régimbart, 1892
 Haliplus figuratus J.Sahlberg, 1908
 Haliplus fiorentini Benetti and Hamada, 2017 g
 Haliplus flavicollis Sturm, 1834 g
 Haliplus fluviatilis Aubé, 1836 g
 Haliplus fulvicollis Erichson, 1837 g
 Haliplus fulvus (Fabricius, 1801) g b
 Haliplus furcatus Seidlitz, 1887 g
 Haliplus fuscatus Clark, 1862
 Haliplus fuscicornis Holmen, Vondel & Petrov, 2006
 Haliplus fuscipennis Germain, 1855
 Haliplus gafnyi Vondel, 1991 g
 Haliplus garambanus Guignot, 1958
 Haliplus gibbus Clark, 1862
 Haliplus gracilis Roberts, 1913 i c g b
 Haliplus gravidoides Vondel & Spangler, 2008 g
 Haliplus gravidus Aube, 1836 i c g
 Haliplus guttatus Aubé, 1836 g
 Haliplus harminae Vondel, 1990
 Haliplus havaniensis Wehncke, 1880 i c g
 Haliplus heydeni Wehncke, 1875 g
 Haliplus holmeni Vondel, 1991 g
 Haliplus hoppingi Wallis, 1933 i c g
 Haliplus hydei Vondel, 1995
 Haliplus immaculatus Gerhardt, 1877 g
 Haliplus immaculicollis Harris, 1828 i c g b
 Haliplus incrassatus Régimbart, 1899
 Haliplus indicus Régimbart, 1899
 Haliplus indistinctus Zimmermann, 1928
 Haliplus insularis Guignot, 1960
 Haliplus interjectus Lindberg, 1937 g
 Haliplus japonicus Sharp, 1873 g
 Haliplus javanicus Vondel, 1993
 Haliplus kamiyai Nakane, 1963
 Haliplus kapuri Vazirani, 1975
 Haliplus kirgisiensis Holmen & Vondel, 2006
 Haliplus kotoshonis Kano & Kamiya, 1932 g
 Haliplus kulleri Vondel, 1988 g
 Haliplus laminatus (Schaller, 1783) g
 Haliplus lamottei Legros, 1954
 Haliplus latiusculus Nakane, 1985
 Haliplus leechi Wallis, 1933 i c g b
 Haliplus leopardus Roberts, 1913 i c g b
 Haliplus lewisii Crotch, 1873 b
 Haliplus lewsii Crotch, 18733 i c g
 Haliplus lineatocollis (Marsham, 1802) g
 Haliplus lineolatus Mannerheim, 1844 g
 Haliplus longulus Leconte, 1950 i c g b
 Haliplus maculatus Motschulsky, 1860 g
 Haliplus maculicollis Zimmermann, 1924
 Haliplus maculipennis Schaum, 1864
 Haliplus manipurensis Vazirani, 1966
 Haliplus methneri Zimmermann, 1926
 Haliplus mimeticus Matheson, 1912 i c g
 Haliplus mimulus Guignot, 1956
 Haliplus minor Zimmermann, 1924 i c g
 Haliplus mucronatus Stephens, 1828 g
 Haliplus mutchleri Wallis i c g
 Haliplus nanus Guignot, 1936 i c g
 Haliplus napolovi Vondel, 2003
 Haliplus natalensis Wehncke, 1880 g
 Haliplus nedungaduensis Vondel, 1993
 Haliplus nitens LeConte, 1850 i c g
 Haliplus oberthuri Guignot, 1935 g
 Haliplus obliquus (Fabricius, 1787) g
 Haliplus oblongus Zimmermann, 1921
 Haliplus ohioensis Wallis, 1933 i c g
 Haliplus oklahomensis Wallis, 1933 i c g
 Haliplus ornatipennis Zimmermann, 1921
 Haliplus ovalis Sharp, 1884
 Haliplus panamanus Chapin, 1930 i c g
 Haliplus pantherinus Aube, 1938 i c g b
 Haliplus perroti Guignot, 1950
 Haliplus peruanus Zimmermann, 1924
 Haliplus philippinus Chapin, 1930
 Haliplus pruthii Vazirani, 1966
 Haliplus pseudofasciatus Wallis, 1933 i c g
 Haliplus pulchellus Clark, 1863 g
 Haliplus punctatus Aube, 1838 i c g
 Haliplus regili Benetti and Hamada, 2017 g
 Haliplus regimbarti Zaitzev, 1907 g
 Haliplus rejseki Stastny & Boukal, 2003 g
 Haliplus robertsi Zimmermann, 1924 i c g b
 Haliplus rubidus Perris, 1857 g
 Haliplus rufescens Régimbart, 1894
 Haliplus ruficeps Chevrolat, 1861 g
 Haliplus ruficollis (De Geer, 1774) g
 Haliplus rugosus Roberts, 1913 i c g
 Haliplus salinarius Wallis, 1933 i c g
 Haliplus salmo Wallis, 1933 i c g b
 Haliplus samojedorum J.Sahlberg, 1880
 Haliplus samosirensis Vondel, 1993
 Haliplus sharpi Wehncke, 1880 g
 Haliplus sibiricus Motschulsky, 1860 g
 Haliplus signatipennis Régimbart, 1892
 Haliplus signatus Sharp, 1882
 Haliplus simplex Clark, 1863 g
 Haliplus sindus Watts, 1988
 Haliplus solitarius Sharp, 1882 i c g
 Haliplus srilankanus Vondel, 1993
 Haliplus stagninus Leech, 1948 i c g b
 Haliplus stepheni Watts, 1988
 Haliplus steppensis Guignot, 1954 g
 Haliplus storeyi Vondel, 1995
 Haliplus strigatus Roberts, 1913 i c g
 Haliplus subguttatus Roberts, 1913 i c g b
 Haliplus subseriatus Zimmermann, 1921
 Haliplus testaceus Zimmermann, 1924
 Haliplus testudo Clark, 1862
 Haliplus thoracicus Zimmermann, 1923
 Haliplus timmsi Vondel, 1995
 Haliplus tortilipennis Brigham & Sanderson, 1972 i c g
 Haliplus triopsis Say, 1825 i c g b
 Haliplus tumidus Leconte, 1880 i c g b
 Haliplus turkmenicus Vondel, 2006
 Haliplus ungularis Wallis, 1933 i c g
 Haliplus uniformis Zimmermann, 1920
 Haliplus valdiviensis Moroni, 1980
 Haliplus vancouverensis Matheson, 1912 i c g
 Haliplus varicator Guignot, 1954
 Haliplus variegatus Sturm, 1834 g
 Haliplus variomaculatus Brigham and Sanderson i c g
 Haliplus varius Nicolai, 1822 g
 Haliplus venustus Régimbart, 1894
 Haliplus wallisi Hatch i c g
 Haliplus wattsi Vondel, 1995
 Haliplus zacharenkoi Gramma & Prisny, 1973 g

Data sources: i = ITIS, c = Catalogue of Life, g = GBIF, b = Bugguide.net

References

External links

Haliplus at Fauna Europaea

Haliplidae
Beetles described in 1802